Bastianelli is an Italian surname. Notable people with the surname include:

Alfredo Bastianelli (born in Rome, 1951), Italian diplomat
Giuseppe Bastianelli (1862–1959), Italian physician and zoologist
Marta Bastianelli (born 1987), Italian cyclist
Valentina Bastianelli (born 1987), Italian racing cyclist

Other uses
Bastianelli P.R.B., Italian flying-boat
Trofeo Internazionale Bastianelli, a professional one day cycling race held annually in Italy

See also 
 Bastiani (disambiguation)

Italian-language surnames
it:Bastianelli